"In the Middle of the Land" is a song by Australian rock group Hoodoo Gurus. It was released in December 1987 as the third and final single from the group's third studio album, Blow Your Cool!. The song peaked at number 79 in early 1988.

In June 2000, Dave Faulkner said "... [it] was written about one of my pet subjects: evangelical preachers and their hypocrisy. As a later song of mine says, 'Follow any creed / If my freedom's guaranteed / I don't mind.'".

Dream Syndicate members Steve Wynn & Mark Walton provided background vocals for this single.

Track listing
7" version (BTS16)
 "In the Middle of the Land" (Dave Faulkner) — 4:06
 "Hayride to Hell, part 2 (The Showdown)" (Faulkner) — 3:29

Personnel
Credits:
 Clyde Bramley — bass, backing vocals  
 Dave Faulkner — lead vocals, guitar
 Mark Kingsmill — drums, cymbals
 Brad Shepherd — guitar, backing vocals
 Producer — Charles Fisher
 Engineer — John Bee
 Mastering — Don Bartley

Charts

References

1987 singles
Hoodoo Gurus songs
1987 songs
Songs written by Dave Faulkner (musician)